Yasser Gharsan Saeed Al-Mohammadi Al-Shahrani (born 25 May 1992) is a Saudi Arabian footballer who plays for Al-Hilal and the Saudi Arabia national team as a left-back or a centre-back. He moved from Al-Qadisiyah to Al-Hilal in 2012, after impressive performances at the 2011 FIFA U-20 World Cup, where he scored against Guatemala. He featured on the official Middle Eastern cover of the game FIFA 16, alongside Lionel Messi.

Early life

Al-Shahrani was born in Dammam, Saudi Arabia.

International career
In May 2018, he was named in Saudi Arabia's 23-man final squad for the 2018 FIFA World Cup in Russia.

In November 2022, he was named in Saudi Arabia's 23-man final squad for the 2022 FIFA World Cup in Qatar. He was part of their 2–1 victory over Argentina in the first match, when he collided with his keeper and suffered fractured jaw, facial bones and teeth, and needed rapid surgery due to internal bleeding. Mohammed bin Salman, Crown Prince of the Saudi Arabia instructed that Yasser be transferred by a private jet to Germany for treatment.

Career statistics

Club

International
Statistics accurate as of match played 22 November 2022.

Scores and results list Saudi Arabia's goal tally first.

Honours

Club
Al-Hilal
 Saudi Professional League: 2016–17, 2017–18, 2019–20, 2020–21, 2021–22
 Kings Cup: 2015, 2017, 2019–20
 Crown Prince Cup: 2012–13, 2015–16
 Saudi Super Cup: 2015, 2018, 2021
 AFC Champions League: 2019, 2021

References

External links

1992 births
Living people
People from Dammam
Saudi Arabian footballers
Al Hilal SFC players
Al-Qadsiah FC players
2015 AFC Asian Cup players
2019 AFC Asian Cup players
Association football midfielders
Association football fullbacks
Saudi Arabia international footballers
Saudi Arabia youth international footballers
Saudi Professional League players
2018 FIFA World Cup players
Olympic footballers of Saudi Arabia
Footballers at the 2020 Summer Olympics
2022 FIFA World Cup players